Roland Drew (born Walter Goss; August 4, 1900 – March 17, 1988) was an American actor.

Biography
Born in 1900 in New York City, Drew made his first film in 1926 and continued to work until the 1940s. Noted primarily as Dolores del Río's leading man in Ramona in 1928, another of his prominent film roles was as Dr. Robinson in The Adventures of Tom Sawyer a decade later. His other appearances include From Nine to Nine, Hitler, Beast of Berlin, Bermuda Mystery, and Two O'Clock Courage. He also gained fame as Prince Barin in the 1940 film serial Flash Gordon Conquers the Universe. 

On Broadway, Drew portrayed Jackson Macy in Shooting Star (1933) and Lieutenant Roget in Paths of Glory (1935).

He retired from acting and became a dressmaker.

He enlisted as a private in the U.S. Army in September 1942 during World War II.

Drew married actress Dorothy Dearing in 1946. On March 17, 1988, he died at his home, aged 87. He was interred with his wife in Angeles Abbey Memorial Park, Compton, California.

Filmography

References

External links

 
 
 
 New York Times Obituary

1900 births
1988 deaths
Male actors from New York (state)
American male film actors
United States Army personnel of World War II
20th-century American male actors
People from Elmhurst, Queens
United States Army soldiers
American male stage actors
Broadway theatre people
Film serial actors